VLL may refer to:

 Virtual leased line, an Ethernet-based communication over IP/MPLS networks
 Visual Light Link, a component of a Lego robotics kit
 Valladolid Airport's IATA code